Gownipalli  is a popular village in the southern state of Karnataka, India. It is located in the Srinivaspur taluk of Kolar district in Karnataka.

Demographics
 India census, Gownipalli had a population of 5033, of whom 2576 are males and 2457 females.

See also
 Kolar
 Districts of Karnataka

References

External links
 http://Kolar.nic.in/

Villages in Kolar district